In mathematics, the p-Laplacian, or the p-Laplace operator, is a quasilinear elliptic partial differential operator of 2nd order. It is written as

In the special case when , this operator reduces to the usual Laplacian. In general solutions of equations involving the p-Laplacian do not have second order derivatives in classical sense, thus solutions to these equations have to be understood as weak solutions. For example, we say that a function u belonging to the Sobolev space  is a weak solution of

if for every test function  we have

where  denotes the standard scalar product.

Energy formulation 
The weak solution of the p-Laplace equation with Dirichlet boundary conditions

in a domain  is the minimizer of the energy functional

among all functions in the Sobolev space  satisfying the boundary conditions in the trace sense.

where  is a suitable constant depending on the dimension  and on  only. Observe that for  the solution is not twice differentiable in classical sense.

Notes

Sources

Further reading
.

Notes on the p-Laplace equation by Peter Lindqvist
    Juan Manfredi, Strong comparison Principle for p-harmonic functions

Elliptic partial differential equations